Daniel Davis Wheeler (July 12, 1841 – July 27, 1916) was an American soldier and recipient of the Medal of Honor for actions during the American Civil War.

Biography 
Daniel D. Wheeler was born 12 July, 1841 and was born in Cavendish, Windsor County, Vermont. He fought in multiple battles of the American Civil War with the 4th Vermont Infantry regiment as a First Lieutenant although he reached the rank of Brigadier General. Wheeler spent the last years of his life in Fredericksburg, Virginia and died there on 27 July, 1916. He is interred in the City Cemetery where in May, 2012, plaques commemorating his service in the Union Army and his Medal of Honor were installed on his grave.

Medal of Honor Citation 
For distinguished bravery in action on 3 May 1863, in action at Salem Heights, Fredericksburg, Virginia, where he was wounded and had a horse shot from under him.

References

External links 

 Find A Grave

1841 births
1916 deaths
American Civil War recipients of the Medal of Honor
United States Army Medal of Honor recipients

Fredericksburg, Virginia

People of Vermont in the American Civil War
Brigadier generals
Vermont in the American Civil War